Flip is a 1985 solo album from Nils Lofgren, longtime guitarist for Neil Young and Bruce Springsteen. The sound is typical of the style of the mid-80s, with a heavy emphasis on the snare drum sound, Lofgren's guitar, and plenty of synthesizer. The name of the album reflects his signature trampoline 'flips' performed on stage whilst playing guitar solos.

Track listing 
All tracks composed by Nils Lofgren.

 "Flip Ya Flip" 4:11
 "Secrets in the Street" 4:33
 "From the Heart" 3:31
 "Delivery Night" 3:54
 "King of the Rock" 5:24
 "Sweet Midnight" 6:49
 "New Holes in Old Shoes" 4:35
 "Dreams Die Hard" 3:34
 "Big Tears Fall" 6:08
Later re-releases include the bonus track "Beauty and the Beast."

Personnel

The Band
Nils Lofgren - vocals, guitars, keyboards
Andy Newmark - drums
Wornell Jones - bass
T. Lavitz - Oberheim PPG
Tommy Mandel - DX7, Prophet 5, Casio

Additional Musicians
Paul Griffin — piano, Hammond organ
Steve Hooper Lombardeli — saxophone
Rick Valenti — harmonica, backing vocals
Devereaux Merryweather, Rudy Rubin, Tico Torres — backing vocals

Production
Produced by Lance Quinn & Nils Lofgren
Recording and mixed by Bill Scheniman
Additional engineering by Mal, assisted by Big Al Greaves, John Cianci, Paul K
Remix Engineer: Ed Stasium, Right Track, NY
Flip Album software by flippagemaker.com

References

1985 albums
Nils Lofgren albums